Cheilodipterus macrodon, the large-toothed cardinalfish , or Tiger Cardinalfish is a species of marine fish in the family Apogonidae. It is widespread throughout the tropical waters of the Indo-Pacific region, Red Sea included.

The large-toothed cardinalfish can reach a maximum size of 25 cm in length, and live at depths of 1-40m.

References

External links
http://www.marinespecies.org/aphia.php?p=taxdetails&id=209373
photo of Cheilodipterus macrodon in iNaturalist

macrodon
Fish described in 1802
Taxa named by Bernard Germain de Lacépède